The 2019–20 Adelaide United FC season was the club's 16th season since its establishment in 2003. The club participated in the A-League for the 14th time and participated in the FFA Cup for 6th time, winning the 2019 FFA Cup tournament.

On 24 March 2020, the FFA announced that the 2019–20 A-League season would be postponed until further notice due to the COVID-19 pandemic in Australia and New Zealand, and subsequently extended indefinitely. The season resumed on 17 July 2020.

Review

Pre-season
Before the 2019 A-League Grand Final, Adelaide United confirmed Apostolos Stamatelopoulos had left the club and joined new A-League club, Western United on 20 March.

On 15 May, Adelaide United updated their squad with Baba Diawara, Scott Galloway, and Jordy Thomassen departing Adelaide. It was announced that Galloway had then signed for his new club, Melbourne City ahead of this current season.

Three days later, it was announced that Isaías, who had recently become an Australian citizen, departed the club. Over a month later, he joined Qatari club Al-Wakrah.

In June, Adelaide United appointed former player Bruce Djite as the Director of Football. On 5 June, Vince Lia and Lachlan Brook re-signed with the club.

On 5 July, Riley McGree signed for Adelaide United and was assigned the "number 8" shirt. In mid-July, Reds signed Curaçao international, Michaël Maria from Charlotte Independence, whilst Craig Goodwin departed the club to join Saudi Arabian club Al-Wehda.

Adelaide United played their first pre-season friendly for the season on 16 July, against North Eastern MetroStars, which resulted in a 3–1 victory. A week later, the club played an intra-club friendly, with the senior squad beating the youth side 1–0, with Nathan Konstandopoulos scoring the only goal. A week later, they beat Adelaide Raiders 5–0.

At the end of July, Adelaide United signed Norwegian striker Kristian Opseth.

On 7 August, Adelaide United travelled to Melbourne for the 2019 FFA Cup round of 32. They beat Melbourne Knights 5–2 and advanced to the next round.

In mid-August, Adelaide United played a "behind-closed-doors" friendly against Melbourne City which ended in a 1–0 loss. Jamie Maclaren scored the only goal in the 15th minute.

Players

Squad information

Transfers

Transfers in

Transfers out

From youth squad

Contract extensions

Technical staff

Squad statistics

Appearances and goals

{| class="wikitable sortable plainrowheaders" style="text-align:center"
|-
! rowspan="2" |
! rowspan="2" |
! rowspan="2" style="width:180px;" |Player
! colspan="2" style="width:87px;" |A-League
! colspan="2" style="width:87px;" |FFA Cup
! colspan="2" style="width:87px;" |Total
|-
!
!Goals
!
!Goals
!
!Goals
|-
|2
|DF
! scope="row" | Michael Marrone

|10+4
|0

|3
|0

!17
!0
|-
|4
|DF
! scope="row" | Ryan Strain

|27
|0

|3+2
|0

!24
!0
|-
|6
|MF
! scope="row" | Stefan Mauk

|9
|0

|0
|0

!9
!0
|-
|7
|DF
! scope="row" | Ryan Kitto

|11+11
|0

|5
|0

!27
!0
|-
|8
|MF
! scope="row" | Riley McGree

|23
|10

|5
|3

!28
!13
|-
|10
|MF
! scope="row" | James Troisi

|13
|1

|0
|0

!13
!1
|-
|11
|FW
! scope="row" | Kristian Opseth

|14+7
|6

|1+2
|0

!24
!6
|-
|14
|FW
! scope="row" | George Blackwood

|14+7
|4

|1+1
|2

!23
!6
|-
|16
|MF
! scope="row" | Nathan Konstandopoulos

|2+7
|1

|2+2
|1

!13
!2
|-
|17
|FW
! scope="row" | Nikola Mileusnic

|21+1
|5

|2+3
|1

!27
!6
|-
|18
|MF
! scope="row" | Lachlan Brook

|4+3
|1

|0+1
|0

!8
!1
|-
|20
|GK
! scope="row" | Paul Izzo

|25
|0

|4
|0

!29
!0
|-
|22
|DF
! scope="row" | Michael Jakobsen

|26
|1

|5
|0

!31
!1
|-
|23
|DF
! scope="row" | Jordan Elsey

|18+3
|2

|4
|0

!25
!2
|-
|24
|FW
! scope="row" | Pacifique Niyongabire†

|0+3
|1

|0+2
|0

!5
!1
|-
|26
|FW
! scope="row" | Ben Halloran

|21
|9

|5
|3

!26
!12
|-
|27
|MF
! scope="row" | Louis D'Arrigo†

|19+2
|0

|2
|0

!23
!0
|-
|28
|MF
! scope="row" | Chen Yongbin

|0
|0

|0
|0

!0
!0
|-
|29
|FW
! scope="row" | Kusini Yengi†

|0+3
|0

|0
|0

!3
!0
|-
|34
|DF
! scope="row" | Yared Abetew†

|1
|0

|0
|0

!1
!0
|-
|35
|FW
! scope="row" | Al Hassan Toure†

|7+5
|2

|5
|5

!17
!7
|-
|36
|DF
! scope="row"| Noah Smith

|0+1
|0

|0
|0

!1
!0
|-
|40
|GK
! scope="row"| Dakota Ochsenham

|0
|0

|0
|0

!0
!0
|-
|42
|FW
! scope="row"| Taras Gomulka

|5
|0

|0
|0

!5
!0
|-
|49
|FW
! scope="row"| Mohamed Toure†

|0+9
|1

|0
|0

!9
!1
|-
!colspan="25"|Players no longer at the club
|-
|1
|GK
! scope="row" | Daniel Margush

|0
|0

|0
|0

!0
!0
|-
|5
|DF
! scope="row" | Michaël Maria

|18+3
|1

|3
|0

!24
!1
|-
|6
|MF
! scope="row" | Vince Lia

|1+1
|0

|1+2
|0

!5
!0
|-
|30
|GK
! scope="row" | Isaac Richards

|1
|0

|1
|0

!2
!0
|-
|31
|MF
! scope="row" | Mirko Boland

|1+4
|0

|3
|0

!8
!0
|-
|32
|FW
! scope="row" | Carlo Armiento†

|0
|0

|0
|0

!0
!0
|}

† = Scholarship or NPL/Y-League-listed player

Disciplinary record

Clean sheets

Pre-season and friendlies

Competitions

Overview
{|class="wikitable" style="text-align:left"
|-
!rowspan=2 style="width:140px;"|Competition
!colspan=8|Record
|-
!style="width:30px;"|
!style="width:30px;"|
!style="width:30px;"|
!style="width:30px;"|
!style="width:30px;"|
!style="width:30px;"|
!style="width:30px;"|
!style="width:50px;"|
|-
|A-League

|-
|FFA Cup

|-
!Total

FFA Cup

A-League

League table

Result by round

Matches
On 8 August 2019, the A-League fixtures for the season were announced. Due to the odd number of teams, Adelaide United will have byes in rounds 4, 10 and 24.

Awards

Adelaide United Goal of the Month award
Adelaide United Goal of the Month award winners were chosen via open-access polls on the club's official website.

References

Adelaide United FC seasons
2019–20 A-League season by team